Eastwood Manor is a Grade II listed building in the village of East Harptree in the English County of Somerset.

History
A house was built at Eastwood by Sir John Newton, using stone from Richmont Castle, during the 16th century, although its exact location is not known.

The current Eastwood Manor was built in 1871. It was built by Charles Adams Kemble (son of the Reverend Charles Kemble rector of Bath) who bought Eastwood Farm, including the Grade I listed Eastwood Manor Farm Steading, and used stone from the local quarry to construct the house. It includes the entrances to two small barite or ochre mines.

In 1892 Charles Adams Kemble sold it to William Bateman Hope who extended it and installed electrical wiring, making it one of the first houses in Somerset to have electric lights. In the 1930s the house was occupied by the Wardell Yerburgh family and then by the businessman Sir Foster Robinson who died there in 1967.

Architecture
Eastwood Manor is in a Gothic Revival style. The two-storey building has an attic and tiled roof.

In 2009 a swimming pool was added to the northern rear elevation.

Garden

The garden contains an avenue of lime trees and other mature trees, herbaceous borders, terraces and a spiral mound. There was once a kitchen garden but this is now a paddock.

References

Grade II listed buildings in Bath and North East Somerset
Houses completed in 1871